The Women's alpine combined competition at the FIS Alpine World Ski Championships 2023 was held  at Roc de Fer ski course in Méribel on 6 February 2023.

Results
The super-G was started at 11:00 and the slalom at 14:30.

References

Women's alpine combined